Ruce may refer to:

 Ruce (book), a book of poems by Otokar Březina
 "Ruce" (short story), a Czech short story by Jan Weiss